Rishi Pillai (born 26 August 1981) is a German cricketer. He was named as the captain of Germany's squad for the 2017 ICC World Cricket League Division Five tournament in South Africa. He played in Germany's opening fixture, against Ghana, on 3 September 2017. He scored the most runs for Germany in the tournament, with a total of 212 runs in five matches.

He made his Twenty20 International (T20I) debut for Germany against Italy, during their two-match series in the Netherlands, on 25 May 2019. The same month, he was named in Germany's squad for the Regional Finals of the 2018–19 ICC T20 World Cup Europe Qualifier tournament in Guernsey.

References

External links
 

1981 births
Living people
German cricketers
Germany Twenty20 International cricketers
Cricketers from Pune
Indian emigrants to Germany